Betli is a rural locality (a selo) in Kakhabrosinsky Selsoviet, Untsukulsky District, Republic of Dagestan, Russia. The population was 20 as of 2010.

Geography 
Betli is located 24 km northwest of Shamilkala (the district's administrative centre) by road. Kakhabroso is the nearest rural locality.

References 

Rural localities in Untsukulsky District